The Neon Handshake is the debut album by London band Hell is For Heroes. The CD was released in February 2003 on Chrysalis Records.

Rock Sound magazine picked it as the "Album of the Year".

In 2005, readers of Kerrang! magazine voted The Neon Handshake the 58th best British rock album ever.

In 2018 the record was re-issued and released by Big Scary Monsters to coincide with the 15th anniversary of the band's debut release.

Track listing
"Five Kids Go" – 3:44
"Out of Sight" – 2:33
"Night Vision" – 3:34
"Cut Down" – 3:04
"Few Against Many" – 4:02
"Three of Clubs" – 3:03
"I Can Climb Mountains" – 3:20
"Disconnector" – 3:26
"You Drove Me To It" – 3:01
"Slow Song" – 5:31
"Sick Happy" – 3:08
"Retreat" – 3:44

References

External links 

Hell Is for Heroes (band) albums
2003 debut albums